The Basilica of Our Lady of Good Health, also known as Sanctuary of Our Lady of Velankanni, is a Marian shrine located at the town of Velankanni in Tamil Nadu, India. The place is also a minor basilica of the Latin Catholic Church dedicated to Our Lady of Good Health. Devotion to Our Lady of Good Health of Velankanni can be traced back to the mid-16th century, attributed to three separate miracles believed by devotees to have been worked at the site: the apparition of Blessed Mary and the Christ Child to a slumbering shepherd boy, the healing of a handicapped buttermilk vendor, and the rescue of Portuguese sailors from a deadly sea storm.

Initially, a simple and modest chapel was built by the Portuguese in Goa and Bombay-Bassein, soon after they washed ashore safely in spite of a severe tempest. More than 500 years later, a nine-day-long festival is still celebrated and draws nearly 5 million pilgrims each year. The place has been called "the Lourdes of the East", because it is one of the most frequented pilgrimage centers in South Asia.

History
Marian apparitions at Velankanni include three apparitions of the virgin-mother Mary of Velankanni in the 16th century, according to oral lore and popular belief. The third noteworthy incident is the reported miraculous rescue of the Portuguese in Goa and Bombay-Bassein, who were sailing away from a deadly monsoon surge and tempest, in the Bay of Bengal in the late 17th century.

The first Marian apparition is said to have occurred in May 1570, when a local shepherd boy was delivering milk to a nearby house. Along the way he met a beautiful woman holding a child, who asked for some milk for the child. After giving her some milk, he continued on under the hot tropical sun, upon finishing his deliveries he found that the jug was still full of fresh and cool milk. A small shrine was built near the site where the boy encountered the woman, a location that came to be called Maatha Kulam, which means "Mother's Pool or Well" in Tamil.

The second Marian apparition is said to have happened in 1597, not far from Maatha Kulam. A beautiful woman with a child in her arms appeared to a crippled boy selling buttermilk. The child asked for a drink of buttermilk. After he drank it, the woman told the boy to visit a gentleman in the next town and ask him to build a chapel in her honour at that location. As the boy set out he realised he had been healed and was no longer lame. A small thatched chapel was built shortly thereafter in honour of "Our Lady of Health" or Aarokia Maatha in Tamil.

The third notable incident occurred when a Portuguese ship sailing from Macao to Ceylon (Sri Lanka) was caught in extreme weather in the Bay of Bengal. The terrified sailors invoked the aid of the Virgin Mary under her title "Star of the Sea". The raging storm suddenly subsided and the entire crew of 150 on board the ship were saved from capsizing. This happened on 8 September, the feast day of the Nativity of Mary. In thanksgiving the sailors rebuilt the shrine, and continued to visit and donate to the cause of the shrine whenever their voyages brought them to the area.

The shrine that began as a thatched chapel in the mid-sixteenth century and became a parish church in 1771, when Indian Catholics were persecuted in the erstwhile Dutch Coromandel, after the Luso-Dutch war was waged by Dutch Protestants. In 1962, the site was elevated to the special status of a minor basilica by Pope John XXIII.

On 3 November 1962, the shrine of Velankanni was elevated to the status of "minor basilica" and merged with the Basilica of St Mary Major in Rome by Pope John XXIII.

Significance and pilgrimage 

For Goan and Konkani people, she is called "Shantadurga" (most compassionate one). This especially includes use of Kotimaram, which has been described as an extended influence of Hinduism on Catholicism, thus making the basilica a meeting point of two of the major religions of the world.

Being a Roman Catholic Marian church, it is dedicated to Our Lady of Good Health. Virgin Mary is depicted wearing a sari. The usual time for pilgrimage is during the annual festival between 29 August to 8 September, Holy Week and Christmas. Some pilgrims, instead of using a mode of transport, perform "walking pilgrimages" to it. They attend mass, novenas, flag-hoisting and carry a palanquin of Mary in a procession. A major event is the procession, where only women are allowed to pull the first car and a statue of Mary is in the last and most decorated one. People of other religions also take part. The pilgrims sometimes shave their heads as an offering and perform ear-piercing ceremonies, both being Hindu traditions. Another ritual considered sacred is dipping oneself in the pond. There is a holy flag which is lowered to signal the end of the festival.

Due to the number of pilgrim visits during festival season, the Indian Railways introduced special train services to the town of Velankanni.

Architecture

The basilica is built in the Gothic style of architecture. The southern side was extended in 1928 and the northern in 1933. The Shrine Basilica contains three chapels, as well as Our Lady's Tank, Church Museum, Priests' Residence, Offering Center, Stations of the Cross, Stations of the Rosary, Shrine Mega Mahal and Vailankanni Beach. The building is painted in white, except for the roof that is made of red tiles.

The early part of the 20th century marked rivalry between Jesuits and Franciscans regarding their influence on missionary work in Velankanni. In 1928, the Church of the Immaculate Heart of Mary (managed by the Jesuits) was demolished and the statues were brought to the Shrine of Our Lady of Good Health; in 1933 the shrine was expanded with two new wings, to the right and to the left of the 'Main Altar', meeting the nave at right angles.

A spacious vestry was provided immediately behind the altar. Thus the entire sacred edifice began to assume the shape of a Latin Cross. Right over the center of the ancient main altar was the miraculous image of Our Lady of Good Health.

In 1956, a new welcome arch was blessed and opened by Bishop Rajarethinam Arokiasamy Sundaram. The illuminated arch stood to show the way to eager pilgrims who sought the protection of Mary. In January 1961, a new central altar, executed in white marble, replaced the former one made of cement concrete. In 1974–75, an extension of the basilica was built behind the existing central altar to accommodate the multilingual pilgrims. It was designed to resemble the Basilica in Lourdes, France.

List of parish priests
The basilica first became a parish in 1771. The list of parish priests (mainly Portuguese) from 1771 until now is as follows:

Gallery

See also
Roman Catholic Diocese of Tanjore
List of basilicas in India 
Basilica of Our Lady of Health, Harihar
Marian apparition
Christianity in Tamil Nadu

References

External links

 Sanctuary of Our Lady of Vailankanni – Official website
 Marian Shrine of Vailankanni TV – Live streaming
Velankanni Church Photos 2018

Good Health
Roman Catholic churches in Tamil Nadu
Catholic pilgrimage sites
Our Lady of Good Health
Churches in Nagapattinam district
Roman Catholic shrines in India